The 2019 Patriot League women's soccer tournament was the postseason women's soccer tournament for the Patriot League held from November 5 through November 10, 2019. The quarterfinals of the tournament will be held at campus sites, while the semifinals and final took place at Glenn Warner Soccer Facility in Annapolis, Maryland. The six-team single-elimination tournament consisted of three rounds based on seeding from regular season conference play. The defending champions were the Boston University Terriers, however they were unable to defend their crown, after failing to qualify for the tournament by finishing ninth in regular season play.  The tournament was won by Navy, who were the #1 seed and defeated Army 2–1 in the final. The conference championship was the fourth for the Navy women's soccer program, all of which have come under coach Carom Babarra.

Bracket

Schedule

Quarterfinals

Semifinals

Final

Statistics

Goalscorers 
2 Goals
 Lauren Drysdale (Army)
 Hannah Hoefs (Loyola (MD))
 Erynn Johns (Army)

1 Goal
 Alyssa Carfagno (Army)
 Sydney Fisher (Holy Cross)
 Carolyn Mang (Navy)
 Dara Murray (Army)
 Gina Peraino (Navy)
 Victoria Tran (Navy)
 Morgan Walsh (Army)

All-Tournament team

Source:

MVP in bold

See also 
 2019 Patriot League Men's Soccer Tournament

References 

 
Patriot League Women's Soccer Tournament